Korea National University of Agriculture and Fisheries (Acronym: KNUAF; Korean, Guknip Hanguk Nongsusan Daehakkyo) is a national founded in 1997. located in Jeonju, Republic of Korea.

See also
List of national universities in South Korea
List of universities and colleges in South Korea
Education in Korea

References

External links
 Official site (English)

Jeonju
Agricultural universities and colleges
National universities and colleges in South Korea
Universities and colleges in North Jeolla Province
Educational institutions established in 1997
1997 establishments in South Korea